Gangnam Station is a station located in both the greater Gangnam area Gangnam District and Seocho District of Seoul, South Korea, on the Seoul Subway Line 2.

This station serves as a crucial transfer point between Line 2 and buses to all over Seoul and southern Gyeonggi Province. It became the northern terminus of the Shinbundang Line on October 29, 2011 until May 28, 2022 when it was extended north to Sinsa, whereas the southern terminus being at Gwanggyo.

Both stations have two tracks and two side platforms.

History
December 23, 1982 - Line 2 station completed.
October 29, 2011 - Shinbundang Line station completed.

The station
The area surrounding the station is an important commercial and entertainment district. The station is located at the western end of Teheranno, home to many corporate headquarters and impressive towers, while the area immediately to the north of the station is densely packed with bars, restaurants and clubs. There are also many shops in the subway station below ground. In 2007, the area was the 10th most expensive shopping street in the world with an average rent of US$431 per square foot.

The section of Gangnam Boulevard from exit No.2 of this station to exit No.5 of Sinnonhyeon Station of Line 9 is designated as a smoke-free zone by the Gangnam District office.

Line 2 runs on the right hand track, whereas the Shinbundang Line runs on the left hand track; this is because the Shinbundang Line is a national railway line (which typically runs on the left), while Line 2 is a subway line (which typically runs on the right in Seoul). This can be confusing to tourists making a transfer here, as many tourists are accustomed to riding on either the left-hand track or the right-hand track.

Station layout

Passenger load
In 2007, it was the busiest subway station in the Seoul Metropolitan Subway system, with approximately 123,000 daily passengers using it on average.

In a survey conducted in 2011 by the Ministry of Land, Transport and Maritime Affairs on 92 Administrative divisions across the country, it reported that Gangnam Station had a daily average of 110,129 people boarding and 114,338 people alighting the subway. Making this the busiest public transit stop, with more than 100,000 people every day.

Vicinity
Exit 1: KIPO Seoul Office
Exit 8: Kukkiwon (World Taekwondo Headquarters)

The headquarters of South Korean skincare and cosmetics manufacturer Skin Food is in the DaeRyung Scecho Tower in Seocho-dong, Seocho-gu nearby to this station.

References

Seoul Metropolitan Subway stations
Railway stations opened in 1982
Metro stations in Gangnam District
Metro stations in Seocho District
Seoul Subway Line 2
Shinbundang Line
1982 establishments in South Korea
Tourist attractions in Seoul
20th-century architecture in South Korea